The first Major League Rugby collegiate draft was held in 2020. Players are eligible for the draft after 3 years in college or 21 years of age. Free agents can try out to join teams at 18 years old.

See also

2020 MLR Draft
MLR expansion draft
College rugby

References

 
 
Annual sporting events in the United States